Bagjana railway station is a railway station in Joypurhat District, Rajshahi Division, Bangladesh.

See also
 Bangladesh Railway
 Chilahati–Parbatipur–Santahar–Darshana line
 Joypurhat railway station
 Santahar railway station

References

Railway stations in Joypurhat District